The 32nd annual Havana Film Festival took place in Havana, Cuba, from 2 December to 12 December 2010.

Festival line-up

Feature films

Films in competition

Films out of competition

First feature

Awards

Coral
Best Feature Film:
First prize: A Useful life by Federico Veiroj
Second prize: Post Mortem by Pablo Larraín
Third prize: The Good Herbs by María Novaro
Special Jury prize: The Invisible Look by Diego Lerman
Best Directing: Pablo Larraín for Post Mortem
Best Screenplay: Pablo Larraín and Mateo Iiribarren for Post Mortem
Best Actor: Alfredo Castro for Post Mortem
Best Actress: Antonia Zegers for Post Mortem
Best Cinematography: Damián García for Chicogrande
Best Art Direction: Erick Grass for José Martí: el Ojo del Canario
Best Editing: Eliane Katz for It's Your Fault
Best Original Music: Santiago Chávez and Judith de León for The Good Herbs
Best Soundtrack: Raúl Locatelli and Daniel Yafalián for A Useful Life
Best First Feature:
First prize: Alamar by Pedro González-Rubio
Second prize: October by Diego Vega and Daniel Vega
Third prize: Of Love and Other Demons by Hilda Hidalgo
Special Jury prize: Hermano by Marcel Rasquin

FRIPESCI
Best Feature Film: Post Mortem by Pablo Larraín

References

External links

Havana Film Festival
2010 festivals in North America
2010 in Cuba
21st century in Havana